HKW Chemnitz-Nord (abbreviation for Heizkraftwerk Chemnitz) is a lignite-fired power station in the northern parts of Chemnitz with a power capacity of 120 megawatts. It has a 301.8 metre tall chimney. In 2013 the chimney was painted in pastel colours by Daniel Buren.

Towers in Germany
Coal-fired power stations in Germany
Chimneys in Germany
Buildings and structures in Chemnitz